The 5th NACAC Under-23 Championships in Athletics were held in
Toluca, Mexico, at the Alberto "Chivo" Córdova Stadium at the
Universidad Autónoma del Estado de México on July 18–20, 2008.  A detailed report on the results was given.

Medal summary

The gold medal winners were published.
Detailed results can be found on the Athletics Canada
website, on the CACAC
website, on the MileSplit
website, and on the Tilastopaja
website.

Men

Women

Medal table (unofficial)

Participation (unofficial)
20 countries are reported to participate. However, an unofficial count through the result lists resulted in 258 participating athletes from only 19 countries:

 (1)
 (7)
 (6)
 (4)
 (22)
 (5)
 (7)
 (22)
 (9)
 (1)
 (4)
 (20)
 (63)
 (2)
 (2)
 (2)
 (3)
 (74)
 (4)

References

NACAC Under-23 Championships in Athletics
Ath
NACAC U23
International athletics competitions hosted by Mexico
Toluca
Sport in the State of Mexico
2008 in youth sport